Walter Sherman Gifford (January 10, 1885 – May 7, 1966) was best known as the president of the AT&T Corporation from 1925 to 1948, after which he served as United States Ambassador to the United Kingdom from 1950 to 1953.

Biography 

Walter Sherman Gifford was born in Salem, Massachusetts on January 10, 1885. He graduated from Harvard University in 1905.  In July 1906 he joined the Western Electric Company in Chicago as Assistant Secretary and Treasurer. In 1911 Gifford left Western Electric, went to Arizona in a copper mining venture that he tired of after six months. However, Theodore N. Vail hired him as Chief statistician for American Telephone & Telegraph in New York. In 1916 he was called to national service during World War I.
 
During the war he became Supervising Director of the Committee on Industrial Preparedness of the National Consulting Board, Director of the Council of National Defense and Advisory Commission, and Secretary of the U. S. Representation on the Inter-Allied Munitions Council. After the war he returned to AT&T and soon became a Vice President. In 1925, at age 40, he became the president of the AT&T Corporation when the existing president Harry Bates Thayer was made chairman of the board of directors. That same year he established the Bell Telephone Laboratories as a separate entity which would take over the work being conducted by Western Electric's engineering department's research division.
According to one historian,
One of Gifford’s most brilliant early staff appointments was that of Arthur W. Page to the job of vice-president for public relations. ... Gifford persuaded him to join AT&T early in 1927.

Gifford had a video telephone conversation in 1927 with Herbert Hoover, then Secretary of Commerce, through AT&T's pioneering technology in television transmission over wire.  He was awarded the Vermilye Medal in 1943.

During Gifford's presidency lasting 23 years, AT&T experienced tremendous growth. Gifford increased operating revenue from $657 million to $2.25 billion. In 1927, Gifford relaunched his firm's overseas operations and by 1948, 72 foreign countries were linked by wire and radio with AT&T lines. In 1950, he retired from the post of chairman of AT&T which he occupied from 1948-1950. By then he had served AT&T for 45 years.

Other information 
Kenneth Bilby (1986) tells of Gifford's courage in business:
..despite his conservative orthodoxy, there were elements of daring in Gifford's character, and he was innovative in corporate finance. In 1919, when utility bond issues were not in great favor in Wall Street, he persuaded his management to go directly to market with a $90-million offering of its own securities. It was a gargantuan sum at the time, larger than any ever raised without the underwriting support of investment bankers. But the over-the-counter offer was quickly subscribed, and AT&T received the full amount without payment of large brokerage commissions.

In 1916 Gifford was named a Fellow of the American Statistical Association.

In 1922 Gifford became one of the founding trustees of the Grand Central Art Galleries, an artists' cooperative established that year by John Singer Sargent, Edmund Greacen, Walter Leighton Clark, and others. Also on the board were the Galleries' architect, William Adams Delano; Robert W. DeForest, president of the Metropolitan Museum of Art; Frank Logan, vice-president of the Art Institute of Chicago; Irving T. Bush, president of the Bush Terminal Company; and Clark. Gifford served as secretary and treasurer for the organization.

After his retirement from AT&T, Gifford served as the U.S. Ambassador to Great Britain from 1950-53. His son Richard P. Gifford succeeded him as an international businessman.

References

External links 

 Harvard Business School Leadership website
 Time Magazine article
 AT&T History website
 Bell Labs

Ambassadors of the United States to the United Kingdom
American business executives
1885 births
1966 deaths
Harvard University alumni
AT&T people
Businesspeople from Massachusetts
Fellows of the American Statistical Association
20th-century American diplomats
Council of National Defense
American telecommunications industry businesspeople